Alto Velo Island (also called Alta Vela Island) is a small uninhabited island south of the island of Hispaniola in the Caribbean Sea.
southwestern coast of the Dominican Republic.

Location

Government
The island is part of the province of Pedernales in the Dominican Republic.

Conservation
Alto Velo and Beata Islands belong to the Jaragua National Park, the largest protected area in the Caribbean region.

History

The island was visited by Christopher Columbus on his second voyage in 1494; his crew caught and killed seabirds and eight Caribbean monk seals on the island, which he named  because from a distance it looked like a tall ship at sail.

In 1863, the Confederate commerce raider CSS Alabama captured and burned at sea the Boston-based schooner Chatelaine off the coast of Alto Velo Island.

In the 1860s, at least three U.S.-based companies claimed the island under the Guano Islands Act; however, the U.S. Department of State determined that the island, despite lying in an area then-disputed between Haiti and the Dominican Republic, likely belonged to the Dominican Republic (due to historical Spanish claims, geography, and other factors) and therefore could not be claimed under the act. A 1932 U.S. Department of State report on the status of Guano Island Act claims included Alto Velo among the islands "to which the United States has no claim."

Dominican officials authorized foreign concessionaires to mine guano from the island until the early 20th century, when synthetic fertilizers became common. A 1950 botanical expedition to Alto Velo noted that "the scars of the mining operations on the leeward slopes of the island" remained visible and that "artifacts of mining still litter portions of the hill."

See also

 List of lighthouses in the Dominican Republic
 Alto Velo Claim
 List of Guano Island claims

References

Further reading 
 
 
 
 List of Lights, Buoys and Fog Signals Atlantic Coast. Retrieved 8 September 2016

Geography of Pedernales Province
Uninhabited islands of the Dominican Republic
Caribbean islands claimed under the Guano Islands Act
Protected areas of the Dominican Republic
Lighthouses in the Dominican Republic